Highway 8 is a provincial highway in the Canadian province of Saskatchewan. It runs from North Dakota Highway 28 at the US border near Elmore until it transitions into Highway 982 just outside the Porcupine Provincial Forest.

Highway 8 is paved from Elmore (km 0) until Langenburg (km 215), and then from MacNutt (km 248) until km 396 near Swan Plain.

History 
Paving of Highway 8 from Highway 10 to 22.6 km northward was announced on June 19, 1998, to begin in July of that year.
In mid-2001, a surfacing project was begun on 17.7 km of Highway 8, from Highway 357 until Kamsack.
A surfacing of 9.5 km of Highway 8 near Moosomin began on July 26, 2001.

As of August 6, 2004, improvement construction had begun on 11.2 km of Highway 8, from Storthoaks until 11 km south of Redvers.

Major attractions 
The Moosomin Lake Regional Park is at km 121.
The Carlton Trail Regional Park is at km 198.
The Langenburg Recreation Site is at km 216.

Major intersections

See also 
Roads in Saskatchewan
Transportation in Saskatchewan

Footnotes

References

External links 

008